Hällevik is a locality situated in Sölvesborg Municipality, Blekinge County, Sweden, with 813 inhabitants in 2010.

1862 Tragedy in the Baltic 
Seven herring fishermen from Hällevik drowned on 17 October 1862. The men, including a father and son, left wives and children. Their names are listed in the Mjällby church archives: Masse Jönsson, Jöns Håkansson, Bengt Håkansson, Hans Jönsson, Sven Pehrsson, Ola Christoffersson, and Sven Christoffersson.

References 

Populated places in Sölvesborg Municipality